Joe McDonald Ingraham (July 5, 1903 – May 27, 1990) was a United States circuit judge of the United States Court of Appeals for the Fifth Circuit and previously was a United States district judge of the United States District Court for the Southern District of Texas. He is best known as being the judge who sentenced the then World Heavyweight Champion Muhammad Ali to the maximum 5-year sentence available for refusing to fight in the unpopular Vietnam War.

Education and career
Born in Pawnee County, Oklahoma, Ingraham received a Bachelor of Laws from National University School of Law (now the George Washington University Law School) in Washington, D.C., in 1927. He was then in private practice in Stroud, Oklahoma until 1928, then in Fort Worth, Texas until 1935, and then in Houston, Texas from 1935 to 1942. He was in the United States Army Air Forces during World War II, from 1942 to 1946, reaching the rank of lieutenant colonel. After the war, he returned to private practice in Houston until 1954.

Federal judicial service
On May 10, 1954, Ingraham was nominated by President Dwight D. Eisenhower to a seat on the United States District Court for the Southern District of Texas vacated by Judge Thomas Martin Kennerly. Ingraham was confirmed by the United States Senate on August 6, 1954, and received his commission the same day. His service terminated on December 31, 1969, due to his elevation to the Fifth Circuit.

On December 2, 1969, President Richard Nixon nominated Ingraham for elevation to a new seat on the United States Court of Appeals for the Fifth Circuit created by 82 Stat. 184. Confirmed by the Senate on December 17, 1969, Ingraham received his commission the following day. He assumed senior status on July 31, 1973, serving in that capacity until his death, on May 27, 1990, in Houston. He served additionally as a judge of the Temporary Emergency Court of Appeals from 1976 to 1988.

References

Sources

1903 births
1990 deaths
Judges of the United States District Court for the Southern District of Texas
United States district court judges appointed by Dwight D. Eisenhower
20th-century American judges
Judges of the United States Court of Appeals for the Fifth Circuit
United States court of appeals judges appointed by Richard Nixon
United States Army Air Forces officers
People from Pawnee County, Oklahoma
20th-century American lawyers
National University School of Law alumni